Gerald "Gerry" Cassidy (born 1940) is a prominent lobbyist in Washington, D.C.  He is the co-founder and  CEO of Cassidy & Associates. Cassidy is a central figure in the 2009 book on lobbying, So Damn Much Money: The Triumph of Lobbying and the Corrosion of American Government.

Cassidy was born 1940, the son of a self-reliant practical nurse with a shakey marriage; she moved him and his three sisters from house to house in Brooklyn and Queens throughout his childhood.

He is a graduate of Villanova University (B.S. 1963) and Cornell Law (J.D. 1967).

Cassidy & Associates pioneered the use of congressional earmarks, used to obtain grants for university clients; Cassidy himself sat on the board of Villanova University and Boston University.  Cassidy was also an aide to Sen. George McGovern and general counsel of the Democratic National Committee's Party Reform Commission.

In March 2000, Cassidy was named #52 on the Forbes "The Power 100."  In early 2007, he became the subject of an extensive Washington Post series, addressing details of his personal life and professional success.

In 2013, Cassidy stepped down from the day-to-day leadership of Cassidy & Associates and became chairman emeritus.

References

External links
Gerry Cassidy
Villanova Magazine press release
Washington Post series index

Lawyers from Washington, D.C.
Villanova University alumni
Cornell Law School alumni
Boston University people
Living people
United States congressional aides
American chief executives
1940 births